Da Big Show is a 2008 Philippine television game show broadcast by GMA Network. Hosted by Ogie Alcasid, it premiered on April 21, 2008. The show concluded in July 2008. It was replaced by Takeshi's Castle in its timeslot.

Hosts

Da Big Boss
Ogie Alcasid

Da Big Boys
More
Less

Da Big Girls
Crispy
Batchy Boi
Liempy
Chunky
Patty
Roasty

Gameplay
In Da Big Show, four teams (composed of three members each) compete in a series of games with the objective of being the last team standing. Each match consists of Philippine games that have gigantic props to amp up the fun.

Imagine the three members of each team being made to wear giant rubber slipper costumes to be able to tackle a giant can a la tumbang preso. Try to picture a representative from two teams dressed as gigantic spiders suspended and trying to jostle each other off a platform 20 feet off the ground. Visualize opposing teams trying to lift 30-pound concrete balls in a game of giant sungka.

The show's biggest challenge is a giant palayok that the winning team has to shatter for them to win the jackpot prize. Should the clay pot remain unbroken, the pot money will be added to the following day's jackpot prize.

References

External links
 

2008 Philippine television series debuts
2008 Philippine television series endings
Filipino-language television shows
GMA Network original programming
Philippine game shows